Pope John XII of Alexandria, was the 93rd Pope of Alexandria and Patriarch of the See of St. Mark.

15th-century Coptic Orthodox popes of Alexandria
1483 deaths